The FIS Cross-Country Balkan Cup is a series of cross-country skiing events arranged by the International Ski Federation (FIS). It is one of the nine FIS Cross-Country Continental Cups, a second-level competition ranked below the World Cup. The Balkan Cup is open for competitors from all nations, but are mainly a competition for skiers from eleven nations; Albania, Bosnia and Herzegovina, Bulgaria, Croatia, Greece, Montenegro, Moldova, North Macedonia, Romania, Serbia and Turkey. 

The Balkan Cup has been held since the 2005–06 season and has been a part of the Cross-Country Continental Cup since then.

World Cup qualification
In the end of certain periods, the overall leaders for both genders receive a place in the World Cup in the following period. The overall winners of the season receive a place in the World Cup in the beginning of the following season.

Overall winners

Men

Women

References

External links
Balkan Cup 2019–20 Calendar at the International Ski Federation

Balkan Cup
Recurring sporting events established in 2005